Cryptogramma cascadensis is a species of fern known by the common names Cascade parsley fern and Cascade rockbrake.

Description
The plant forms a clump from a rhizome. It has two types of leaves. The sterile leaf is flat with lobed oval or diamond-shaped leaflets, and the fertile leaf is longer, with narrow, thick, fingerlike leaflets with edges curled under to cover the sporangia on the undersides. The leaves are deciduous.

Taxonomy
Formerly lumped with Cryptogramma acrostichoides, C. cascadensis was described as a distinct species by Ed Alverson in 1989.

Distribution and habitat
It is native to western North America from British Columbia to Montana to California, where it grows in the cracks and crevices of mountain talus slopes, especially in moist subalpine areas on volcanic or granite rocks.

References

External links
Jepson Manual Treatment
USDA Plants Profile
Flora of North America
Photo gallery

cascadensis
Ferns of California
Plants described in 1989